The tank cascade system, or wewa-ellangava system, is an ancient Sri Lankan irrigation infrastructure. The system is a network of small tanks draining to large reservoirs that store rainwater and surface runoff for later use. Originating in the 1st millennium BCE, the system was designated a Globally Important Agricultural Heritage System by the United Nations Food and Agriculture Organization in 2017. Centralized bureaucratic management of large-scale systems was implemented from the 3rd to the 13th centuries.

Geography 
The tank cascade system is largely located in the semi-arid north-central section of the island, which experiences equatorial heat, limited freshwater, and erratic rainfall patterns. Minimal groundwater storage capacity, high evaporation, and low or variable precipitation thanks to the monsoon cycle "in this hard rock region meant that no stable human settlement would have been possible without recourse to the storage of surface water in small tanks." Granite and charnockite underlie this area, decreasing permeability. The "undulating topography" of the island's dry zone is also appropriate for pond or reservoir construction.

Overall Sri Lanka has 80 major dams, and 18,000 extant tanks, or wewa. Between 10,000 and 14,000 tanks are in active use as irrigation sources; the majority of these hold water in the north-central lowland dry zone.

History 

Whereas the agriculture of Fertile Crescent arose from stored water in low bottomland soil, and the agriculture of ancient Egypt was dependent on retained Nile River flood waters, ancient Sri Lankans used a chain of reservoir systems as their water source. Sri Lanka has been called a "hydraulic civilization." Similar ancient water engineering projects in tropical and subtropical climates include the qanats of Iran, oasis in the Near East and north Africa, and the Gurganj Dam of Amu Darya.

Researchers theorise that the evolution of the tank cascade began with rain-fed agriculture and then became increasingly sophisticated beginning with diverting rivulets, then permanent rivers, followed by a leap forward with the construction of spillways, weirs and ultimately sluices, then the construction of reservoirs, until, at the apogee of development, ancient Sri Lankans were able to successfully dam up perennial rivers and use the water as they saw fit. Historic uses of the tank cascade system included human needs (drinking water, sanitation, food production), ecosystem enrichment, urban development, administrative boundary setting ("water cordons"), and natural disaster mitigation.

Rainwater reservoirs were being constructed on the island as early as 300 BCE—there are assertions that Sorabora Wewa in Mahiyangana was constructed by the yaksha spirits before the Indo-Aryan migration to the island—and an estimated total of 30,000 wewa have been built over the history of Sri Lanka.

The existence of what is now called the tank cascade system is recorded in the Dīpavaṃsa and the two Mahāvaṃsa chronicles, which describe tanks, ponds, water holes, dams, canals, irrigation funding grants, irrigation income, irrigation taxes, and irrigation laws.

An estimated 15,000 tanks were built between 300 and 1300 CE, during the Anuradhapura Kingdom (437 CE-845 CE) and Polonnaruwa Kingdom (846 CE-1302 CE) eras. Sri Lanka irrigation engineers of this period were supposedly summoned or hired by other kingdoms for their expertise.

In the 9th century, bureaucracy to organise the irrigation system included a committee known as the Twelve Great Reservoirs.

The most famous surviving exemplars of the irrigation infrastructure used by Sri Lankan elites are the Abhayavapi rainwater reservoir in Anuradhapura built by Pandukabhaya (437-366 BCE) and the "lion rock" fortress Sigiriya, a UNESCO World Heritage Site. The only possible source of water at Sigiriya (which sits 360 meters atop the plain) is rainwater, which was cunningly managed through a network of pools, underground channels and drains.

Other historic landmarks of Sri Lanka water engineering include the lion pond of Mihinthale, the stone lotus pond of Polonnaruva, and the architecture of Kumara Pokuna, the royal baths of Parakramabahu the Great.

Thousands of modest tanks with hyperlocal catchment areas were built at the same time as "the larger and more impressive network of irrigation systems that [were]…controlled and directed by the kings and other higher echelons of the irrigation bureaucracy." The extensive tank cascade infrastructure incorporated local and regional Buddhist monasteries by providing them with their own irrigation access and related incomes. In contemporary Sri Lanka, "Buddhist monks of any given village…are often consulted on water management decisions and lead agro-based cultural festivities."

Eventually the tank cascade system entered a period of decline and partial abandonment. Maintenance of the system between the 1200s and the 1700s CE, considered the "dark ages of tank civilization," is poorly understood. Very little is known of this period as the historical record is thin, but the Rājākariya labour system may have been involved. Dutch colonial administrators (1640-1796 CE) mostly concerned themselves with cultivation of coastal areas and lucrative crops like cinnamon and seem to have ignored the inland tank cascade systems. During the British colonial period, the Rājākariya system was abolished and the tank cascade system seemingly suffered as a result.

In the late 1800s CE an effort was made to reclaim and reorganise the surviving remnants of the tank cascade system; water sluices were replaced on several hundred tanks, and restoration projects were initiated for larger elements including Yodha Ela canal, Kala Wewa tank, Kantale tank, Giant's Tank and Minneriya-Elahara. British records also tell of village irrigation managers creating sluices from hollow tree trunks or clay pots turned pipes.

The Sri Lankan Department of Agricultural Services has overseen irrigation-management groups, called Farmers Organizations, since 1979. Sri Lanka's current water management plan seeks to preserve the ecosystem and cultural benefits of the wewa system while making large-scale investments in drinking water systems, sewage treatment plants, and commercial-industrial water infrastructure. In addition to the tank cascade system, surface irrigation has been used on the island since the mid-20th century. One source says "the tanks have been largely untouched since the 1970s with the development of large irrigation and hydropower schemes."

Similar historic tank cascade systems can be found in Tamil Nadu state in southern India and West Bengal state in eastern India.

Hydrology and function 

The catchment sites are called wewa (වැව්), from the Sinhala language word for tank. Dr. Tennakoon explains, "To an Englishman the term tank can mean a water container made out of clay or a metal to store a large amount of water which is totally different from a reservoir of water in Sri Lanka, constructed on a land surface as an inseparable part of it, arresting and retaining water." Village tanks and cascades are "naturalized" and generally built with permeable natural materials rather than concreted in place. Tanks can be any size from small vernal pools to huge perennial lakes "thousands of hectares in surface area."

These tanks are connected into a series, the "cascade" or ellangava, so that an emphemeral waterflow can be used, stored for future use, or conveyed elsewhere. (Ellangava is a compound word combining ellan "hanging" and gava "next to one another.") The water flows through channels and spillways within a small or medium-sized drainage area (called kiul ela and ranging in size from 13 to 26 km2, with an average size of 20 km2.). While the English language word cascade is suggestive of rapids or steep waterfalls, the meandering flow of an ellangava is quite slow due an extremely minimal gradient. (Think instead of "cascade" in the sense of a cascade of events, like a domino run or a Rube Goldberg device.)

The cascade network draws from or serves to a variety of reservoirs: pahala wewa (village tank), kulu wewa (forest tanks), pin wewa (temple tanks), olagam wewa (supplementary tanks), ilaha wewa (storage tanks), et al. Wewas are edged with earthen embankments (or bund) called wekandas with integrated water gates called kuto sorowwas, horowwas (sluice) or bisokotuwas (valve pit) that release water into the canal system. The extent or expanse of water in the reservoir is called diyagiluma; the “dry lakebed” or “meadow” or parkland that the cascade potentially fills with water is wew pitiya. Village livestock congregate at the wew pitiya in the dry season. The upland stream channels are called diya para, the drainage channel exiting a village tank and paddy field is called kiwul ela.

The upstream edge of the wewa is usually planted with a protective treeline called gasgommana and a reed bed for filtration, called perahana; the downstream edge is planted with biodiverse "interceptor" vegetation called kattakaduwa, intended as a bioremediation trap for salts and other contaminants. The gosgommana may be planted with indigenous species including Bassia longifolia, Terminalia arjuna, Crateva adansonii and Diosoyros malabarica. Herbs and medicinal plants are grown in the upper thaulla area of the system, and vegetables are often grown on the mounded barriers that separate paddy fields.

Some upstream elements of the system were designed to trap sediment that could eventually block the canals, while other upstream "forest tanks" serve as watering holes to keep wildlife out of the human water supply. Still other wewa elements are engineered to recharge the aquifer. Studies of similar tank cascade systems in India found that they increase well recharge by 40 per cent and decrease surface runoff by 75 per cent.

The cascade network can be understood as an integrated, human-managed ecosystem "where water and land resources are organized within the micro-catchments of the dry zone landscape, providing basic needs to human, floral and faunal communities through water, soil, air and vegetation."

Use 
The stored water is mainly used for paddy field cultivation of Asian rice (Oryza sativa). The paddy fields are called wela; the fields closest to the water gate are called purara wela or purana vela, depending on transliteration (meaning old fields). The purara wela were originally communal. Fields further away are called akkara wela (acre field), and were often developed during the European colonial period, are privately owned, and have a less favourable water supply. The tank cascade system is also used to irrigate kitchen gardens and a now-prohibited slash-and-burn system for growing corn called chena.

The farmers of the Sri Lankan paddy fields originally grew heritage rice varieties like Suwandal but have now largely transitioned to Green Revolution strains of rice.

There are more than 7,500 village-scale wewa (which have an "irrigated command area of 80 ha or less, as defined by the Agrarian Services Act No. 58 of 1979") in use today, along with many other reservoirs that are either larger or no longer used for traditional purposes.

Locals coordinate water use through Farmers Organizations and "appoint a person called Jala Palaka [water controller], who is supposed to release water according to the requirement of the farmers and the domestic users. The normal practice is that the water controller retains some water in the tank for domestic purposes."

Village water management practices vary and depend on the social structure of the community and "locally evolved" systems.

Historic village wewas had strict codes surrounding the use of the various bodies of water in the tank cascade system, with designated areas for bathing, cleaning, watering animals, laundry and so forth. In many districts, the village tank system provides drinking water through well recharge; the existence of a small to moderately sized tank raises the groundwater levels in the immediate environment. Farmers capitalise on this by digging a series of wells near the tank body, which they use to extract water for drinking and washing.

Larger reservoirs may have buildings or huts built along the shore, and may be used for freshwater fishing, hunting or poaching, and lotus flower picking, in addition to the typical agricultural and pastoral uses.

Development agencies hope that revitalising the system could both mitigate some of the negative effects of climate change and restore some of the comity lost to the Sri Lankan Civil War, although the system (which originated during a golden age of the Sinhalese culture) may be less nostalgic for neighbours of Tamil ethnicity or Muslim faith.

Kidney disease 
Some districts of Sri Lanka have epidemic rates of Chronic Kidney Disease of Unknown Etiology (CKDu). Pollution of groundwater by chemical-agricultural runoff is a suspected factor; men are more likely than women to develop the condition.

Kidney disease rates are highest in areas that use water diverted from the Mahaweli River.

Ecological and sociological dimensions 
Benefits of the tank cascade system include creating cooler microclimates that serve as wildlife habitats, encouraging biodiversity through the establishment of many ecological niches and ecotones, and establishing conditions for a "unique decentralized social system in Sri Lanka where farmers have held the highest social rank."

The wewas and connecting channels are used as water sources and habitat by both domestic livestock and indigenous wildlife, including Sri Lankan elephants.

A biodiversity survey of just one tank cascade system in the Malwathu Oya river watershed found that it supported approximately 400 plant and animal species.

The local tank cascade systems persisted and stabilised local communities even when changing regimes on the national level led to the decline of the "large-scale centrally managed" tank cascade systems.

Farmers who were interviewed about their relationship with the tank cascade system referenced the Theravada Buddhist principle of Pratītyasamutpāda, suggesting that the "concept of a plurality of causes directly underpins the interconnected eco-systems approach that farmers of the tank cascade system apply to water."

Active restoration of an ellangava-wewa system to historic standards can be observed at Alisthana at the 112-kilometre post on A9 road.

Gallery

See also 
Sri Lanka dry-zone dry evergreen forests
Qanat (Middle East and North Africa)
Johad (Northern India)
Minneriya National Park
Yala National Park
Kaudulla National Park
Pidurangala Vihara

References

External links 
United Nations Development Programme: Ancient water tanks of Sri Lanka to adapt to a changing climate
P.B. Dharmasena agriculture and water management teaching slideshows
Google Scholar Vindanage small tank papers
Proposal - Globally Important Agricultural Heritage System (GIAHS) Designation: The Cascaded Tank Village System (CTVS) in the Dry Zone of Sri Lanka - report by Sri Lanka Ministry of Agriculture & FAO UN

Irrigation
Permaculture
Rainwater harvesting
Water supply
Environment of Sri Lanka

Globally Important Agricultural Heritage Systems